Nino Pasikashvili (born December 4, 1991) is a Georgian football defender. She played for Ataşehir Belediyespor in the Turkish First League, and the Georgian national team. She previously played in the Georgian Championship for Iveria Khashuri, Norchi Dinamoeli, with whom she also played the European Cup, for the Belarusian team FC Minsk, for the Ukrainian  team WFC Zhytlobud-1 Kharkiv and for the Turkish club Adana İdmanyurduspor.

Playing career

Club

In the 2012–13 season, Nino Pasikashvili transferred to   fc minsk  playing in the Belarus women's first league , In the 2013–14 season, Nino Pasikashvili transferred to  FC Kharkiv playing in the Ukraine Women's first league, in  2014–16 season, Nino Pasikashvili transferred to Adana İdmanyurduspor playing in the Turkish Women's First Football League.

On February 5, 2016, she signed with the Istanbul-based club Ataşehir Belediyespor.

International
Pasikashvili played for the Georgia women's national U-17 and U-19 teams before she appeared for the Georgia national team. She took part at the 2015 FIFA Women's World Cup qualification (UEFA) – Group B matches, and scored one goal.

Career statistics
.

Honours
 Turkish Women's First League
 Ataşehir Belediyespor
 Runners-up (1): 2015–16
 Third places (1): 2016–17

References

External links

Living people
1991 births
Women's footballers from Georgia (country)
Women's association football defenders
Expatriate women's footballers from Georgia (country)
Expatriate women's footballers in Belarus
Expatriate women's footballers in Turkey
Adana İdmanyurduspor players
Ataşehir Belediyespor players
FC Minsk (women) players
Georgia (country) women's international footballers
Expatriate sportspeople from Georgia (country) in Turkey
Expatriate sportspeople from Georgia (country) in Belarus